Los Reyes Magos (The 3 Wise Men in the United States) is a 2003 Spanish animated film. It tells the story of the visit of the Magi to the baby Jesus and the wrath of Herod. The film was directed by Antonio Navarro, who was nominated for a Goya Award for this film. The film contains the voice talents of José Coronado, Juan Echanove and Imanol Arias in the original version and the voice acting of father-son actors Martin Sheen and Emilio Estevez in the English dub.

Summary
A bright star guides Melchior, Gaspar, and Balthazar toward a treasure meant for the unborn King of Kings. To make the three wise men's quest even more difficult, King Herod's evil counselor, Belial, is among them in disguise, trying to sabotage their mission!

Plot
Jimmy, a boy disillusioned about Christmas, visit's his uncle Alfredo at his shop, who recounts the story of the Nativity Story in a different point of view.

In ancient times, Herod the Great with his advisor Belial are searching for the Royal Treasures. Meanwhile, three powerful Magi – Balthazar, Gaspar, and Melchior – follow the Star of Bethlehem after its light shines upon them, hoping to find the King of Kings (Melchior hopes for it to lead him to a Valley of Gold). They cross paths in a small village, saving the villagers from bandits and rescue a young revolutionist Sarah, who joins them on their journey. Herod finds out about this and he and Belial arrange Tobias, son of late general Jason, to act as a spy.

In Judea, the Magi visit Herod, the latter requesting have them return when they find the child so in secret he can kill him. One of his advisers, Baruch, reveals their destiny: they are to find the royal treasures consisting of gold, frankincense, and myrrh, and bring them to newborn baby Jesus, warning them of Herod and Belial's scheme. They are chased by the palace guard. Tobias helps them escape and gets wounded. They are forced to let him come along as they head for the City of Salt along the Dead Sea. Belial has Tobias lure them to Black Crow Canyon, but the group manage to escape his spells.

The group manage to get along during the journey, where Sarah and Tobias stumble upon a slavery mine. Sarah reveals that when she was young, Herod ordered all of the villagers and one of his generals executed because they offered slaves sanctuary. Before she could reveal the general's name, she is bitten by a scorpion and falls ill. The magi find the city and uncover the Temple of Ashta. Tobias turns his back on Herod when the general is revealed to be his father.

Inside the temple, each magi is tested and finally given a treasure when they pass them. Herod's forces arrives as the moon blocks out the sun; however, the henchmen disintegrate and the temple conceals itself once the magi exit as the surviving soldiers flee. Belial transforms into a gigantic monster. Eventually, they are able to defeat him in the same manner King David defeated Goliath, destroying the enchanted moon and blinding Belial as he falls to his death. Herod gives them an ultimatum: the treasures or Baruch's life. Herod is soon defeated and Melchior punishes Herod with coal. In the end, they reach Bethlehem and offer the treasures to the newborn baby Jesus.

Back in modern times, Jimmy received a visit from the Three Wise Men. He is given Aristobulus, Sarah's kangaroo rat.

Cast

Home media
The film was released on DVD on November 1, 2005.

See also
 List of Christmas films

References

External links

2003 films
2003 animated films
Spanish animated films
2000s Spanish-language films
Spanish Christmas films
2000s Christmas films
2000s Spanish films